Waikato is a top-tier local government region of New Zealand extending from Thames-Coromandel District to Taupo District.

Waikato may also refer to:
 Waikato District, a second-tier local government region of New Zealand (part of Waikato Region) 
 Waikato, area subjected to the 1860s Invasion of the Waikato
 Waikato River, longest river in New Zealand
 Waikato (iwi), a Māori tribe
 Waikato (New Zealand electorate), a general electorate
 Hauraki-Waikato, a Māori electorate
 Port Waikato, a small town
 HMNZS Waikato (F55), a frigate

Organisations
 Waikato Rugby Union, a governing body for rugby union
 Waikato Rugby League, a governing body for rugby league
 Waikato FC, a football (soccer) club
 Waikato Australian Football League
 Diocese of Waikato
 University of Waikato